A pistachio is a culinary nut and the tree that bears it.

Pistachio may also refer to:

 The color named Pistachio, a pale green similar to the color of the nut's interior meat
 Pistachio ice cream, an ice cream flavor made with pistachio nuts or flavor
 Pistachio oil, a pressed oil, extracted from the fruit of Pistacia vera, the pistachio nut
 Pistachio pudding, a green pudding made from pistachio nuts
 The L4 microkernel family, a computer operating system component
 Pishtaco, a South American bogeyman
 The Pishtacos, a Peruvian gang
 Mitsubishi Pistachio, a three-door sedan introduced by Mitsubishi Motors in December 1999
 Yaz Pistachio, a character in Bloom County
 Vincenzo Pistacchio, Catholic Bishop of Bitetto (1499–1518) and Conversano (1494–1499), Italy